Berekum is a city  and is the capital of Berekum Municipal in the Bono Region of Ghana. Berekum has a population of 62,364. The native language of the Berekum people is the Bono Twi.

Towns 
Pepaase, Akroforo, Kotaa, Domeabra, Ampenkro, Mpatasie, Tewbabi, Abisase, Koraso, Adom, Amankokwaa, Jamdede, Domfete, Jinijini, Fetentaa, Ayinasu, Botokrom, Kyereyawkrom, Nkyenkyemam, Nsapo, Amomaso, Nanasuano, Benkasa, Biadan, Senase, Akatim, Gyankontabuo, Kato, Namasua, Kutre 1, Kutre 2, Mpatapo

Climate

Stadiums and sports

Stadiums
	 
Golden City Park

Sports
Professional sports teams based in Berekum include:	 
 Berekum Chelsea	 
 Berekum Arsenal

Natives

 Kwadwo Afari-Gyan
Emmanuel Agyemang-Badu
Samuel Amofa
Kwesi Appiah
George Benneh
Nkrabeah Effah Dartey
Asamoah Gyan
Asiedu Nketia
Kofi Adoma Nwanwani
John Paintsil
Isaac Sackey

References

	

		 	

Populated places in the Bono Region
Districts of Ghana